Abeoforma whisleri is a single-celled eukaryote that belongs to the Ichthyosporea clade, a group of protists closely related to animals.

A. whisleri was isolated from the digestive tract of a marine invertebrate, specifically the filter-feeding mussel Mytilus sp. A. whisleri has a very complex life-cycle, yet to be resolved. It includes several different cell stages, ranging from amoeboidal, hyphal-like and plasmodial stages, which can present filopodia-like (pseudopodia) structures. They also present coenocytic spherical stages with prominent vacuoles and several nuclei. All of those stages undergo dramatic morphological changes and have a cell wall (except for the amoeboid stage).

Taxonomy 
A. whisleri is a member of the Ichthyosporea clade, within the Teretosporea, which is the earliest branching holozoan lineage.

Applications 

A. whisleri can easily be cultured axenically in marine broth medium. Given its phylogenetic position as a close unicellular relative of animals and its high capacity to modify cell morphology, A. whisleri could potentially provide important insights both into the origin of multicellular animals and into the control of cell shape in eukaryotes.

References 

Mesomycetozoea
Protists described in 2008
Ichthyosporean species